Shag (also known as Shag: The Movie) is a 1989 American comedy film starring Bridget Fonda, Phoebe Cates, Annabeth Gish, Page Hannah, Jeff Yagher and Scott Coffey. Directed by Zelda Barron, the film features Carolina shag dancing and was produced in cooperation with the South Carolina Film Commission. The soundtrack album was on Sire/Warner Bros. Records.

Plot
Four teenage girlfriends escape their middle-class parents for a few days in 1963 for an adventure in Myrtle Beach, South Carolina, the big spring festival promises a dance contest, beer blasts, and many cute boys.

Carson McBride is engaged to Harley, the boring son of a business man; Melaina Buller is a restless preacher's daughter; Luanne Clatterbuck is a conservative senator's daughter; and Caroline Carmichael, "Pudge", is self-conscious about her weight. They stay at Luanne's parents vacation home.

At a club, Melaina hooks up and leaves with a guy in his car. She then gets attacked and covered in shaving cream by two local girls. Earlier overhearing them talking about a beauty contest, she said she'd enter and beat them. Carson and Pudge hang out with Buzz and Chip, while Luanne is trying to escape another.

At the car-hop, Buzz flirts with Carson, ignoring that she's engaged and she is drawn to him. Pudge offers to teach Chip the shag, and he grudgingly relents. When the girls get home, Carson calls her fiancé, telling him she's at Myrtle Beach, but not that she went out with another.

Chip arrives when Pudge is not ready, but she is pleased and they begin the dance lessons. Buzz wakes Carson dangling a fly fishing lure in her face, asking her to go fishing. She insists nothing will ever happen between them, he agrees, saying they should just be friends. Melaina begins practicing her beauty pageant dance routine, but when Luanne walks in on her, she convinces her into giving a speech from Gone with the Wind instead.

Fishing, Carson and Buzz begin to get closer, while Chip and Pudge ask each other questions about sex and relationships. Buzz doesn't believe Carson will marry Harley, and makes her confront her beliefs and rules. The girls later watch Melaina in the contest. She loses to Suette because Luanne made her be a more modest contestant; she wins doing a dance routine in a bikini. Harley arrives during the contest so Carson hides, while Luanne seeks him out. Melaina gets Luanne to use her daddy's name as a Senator to invite Jimmy Valentine to the house for a small party, which gets out of control.

Melaina spends the evening dancing with and impressing Jimmy, Carson spends more time with Buzz, Luanne and Harley get close, and Pudge and Chip get to know each other more. Carson and Buzz go to Luanne's father's yacht and end up sleeping together. Luanne and Harley realize they have feelings for each other and are better suited than Harley and Carson were. Chip makes mistakenly says his feelings for Pudge are friendship and she rejects him.

Melaina tries to get Jimmy's attention in the morning, but he's still drunk and his manager has come to get him. Realizing the agent is the real celebrity maker, she focuses on him instead. Luanne and Harley wake and are told by the maid that her parents are coming to judge the shag contest. She sends Chip to pick them up and take them to the pavilion while they repair the damage done to the home. Pudge takes Melaina to the pavilion to meet with Jimmy's agent, seeing Chip she realizes he really does care.

Luanne and Harley, with Buzz and Carson (who snuck back from the yacht), follow Pudge and Melaina to the pavilion to watch Pudge and Chip in the contest. Once they all see Luanne's parents, she says she will lie to them about the weekend. Carson insists she tell the truth, so they agree to be honest. Carson tells Harley she can't marry him because she's in love with Buzz, and Luanne blurts out they had sex in the yacht.

Harley tries to hit Buzz, who ducks and he hits a mirror instead, so Luanne comforts him. Chip and Pudge win the contest and agree to stay in touch while he attends Annapolis; Melaina impresses the agent who agrees to take her on as a client; Luanne ends up with Harley; and Carson realizes she does not need to be married to be happy.

Cast
 Phoebe Cates as Carson McBride
 Bridget Fonda as Melaina Buller
 Annabeth Gish as Caroline "Pudge" Carmichael
 Page Hannah as Luanne Clatterbuck
 Robert Rusler as Buzz Ravenel
 Scott Coffey as Chip Guillyard
 Tyrone Power Jr. as Harley Ralston
 Jeff Yagher as Jimmy Valentine
 Carrie Hamilton as Nadine
 Leilani Sarelle as Suette

Reception
The film grossed approximately $6.9 million at the U.S. box office. Despite the film's box office underperformance, the film received mixed to positive reviews from critics. Rotten Tomatoes shows an approval rating of 65% based on 17 reviews.

Stephen Holden of The New York Times wrote Shag, "a teen-age nostalgia film set in the summer of 1963, suggests a frothy female answer to Barry Levinson's 'Diner,' with a Southern twist." Roger Ebert, who gave the film 3 stars, praised the actors of the film, calling them "best of the younger generation in Hollywood, and they treat their material with the humor and delicacy it deserves."

TV Guide also complimented the actors, calling them "uniformly attractive and energetic" performers who can "deliver performances that range from likable to delicious." The Austin Chronicle wrote, "Fonda's portrayal of the bad-girl preacher's daughter...steals the show." Margaret Moser, also of the Chronicle, wrote a retrospective review stating "the cast and acting raise this ultimately charming film from sleeper to cult status without stooping to pointless sex or nudity."

Sheila Benson of the Los Angeles Times gave a positive review, writing "Named for a particularly Southern dance craze, 'Shag' is an artfully directed, frequently funny and carefully observed story" and praised the dance sequence, which was choreographed by Kenny Ortega.

Soundtrack
The original soundtrack album was released by Sire/Warner Bros Records on August 2, 1989. It was available on vinyl, cassette and CD.

 "The Shag" – Tommy Page
 "I'm in Love Again" – Randy Newman
 "Our Day Will Come" – k.d. lang and The Reclines
 "Ready to Go Steady" – The Charmettes
 "Shaggin' on the Grand Strand" – Hank Ballard
 "Oh What a Night" – The Moonlighters
 "Saved – La Vern Baker"
 "I'm Leaving It All Up to You" – La Vern Baker, Ben E. King
 "Surrender" – Louise Goffin
 "Diddley Daddy" – Chris Isaak

Home media
The initial VHS home video version was released on June 3, 1997. However, legal copyright infringements led to a second VHS release on January 13, 1998, that features different songs, or no music at all in some scenes compared to the original theatrical release. The 1997 home video version has a box cover almost identical to the theatrical poster, while the modified copyright-compliant version has different cover artwork.

Shag was released on Region 1 DVD on May 22, 2001. The Blu-ray of the movie was released on June 27, 2017 by Olive Films.

References

External links
 
 
 
 Official movie trailer

1989 films
1980s teen comedy films
American coming-of-age comedy films
American independent films
American teen comedy films
British teen comedy films
British coming-of-age comedy films
British independent films
Films set in 1963
Films set in South Carolina
Films shot in South Carolina
Films with screenplays by Robin Swicord
Metro-Goldwyn-Mayer films
Palace Pictures films
Beach party films
Teensploitation
1989 comedy films
1989 independent films
Films directed by Zelda Barron
1980s female buddy films
1980s English-language films
1980s American films
1980s British films
American teen romance films
1980s teen romance films